The Musée national Jean-Jacques Henner is a French art museum dedicated to the works of painter Jean-Jacques Henner (1829–1905). It is located in the 17th arrondissement of Paris at 43, Avenue de Villiers.

The museum in housed within an 1878 hôtel particulier by architect Nicolas Félix Escalier, formerly owned by the painter Guillaume Dubufe, acquired by Henner's niece in 1921. It was inaugurated as a museum in 1924; it became a national museum in 1943. Today the museum contains a large collection of paintings and drawings by Alsatian painter Jean-Jacques Henner, including some 1,000 sketches, documents and souvenirs distributed in seven rooms on four floors of exhibition space. The collection includes more than 130 portraits, as well as mythical themes and figures in dream landscapes that approached Symbolism. Many studies are displayed with finished paintings, together with descriptions by major critics of the day.

Temporary exhibitions 
 7 November 2009 – 8 February 2010: "Francisco de Goya's La Tauromaquia"
 2 June – 6 September 2010 : "Visions on Henner's art of drawing"
 1 February – 2 July 2012: "From impression to dream: Henner's landscapes"
 16 November 2012 – 16 September 2013: "Sensuality and spirituality. In search of the absolute"

See also 
 List of museums in Paris
 List of single-artist museums

References 

 Paris-Tourism article
 Paris Voice article, Art News, July 1996, by Sandra Kwock-Silve
 Paris.org entry
 ParisInfo entry
 Isabelle de Lannoy, Musée national Jean-Jacques Henner: catalogue des peintures, Editions de la Réunion des musées nationaux, 1990. .

External links 
 Official site

Henner
Henner
Henner
Henner
1924 establishments in France
Buildings and structures in the 17th arrondissement of Paris
Historic house museums in Paris
Museums devoted to one artist